Rabí is a town in Klatovy District in the Plzeň Region of the Czech Republic. It has about 500 inhabitants. It is known for ruins of the Rabí Castle, one of the biggest castles in the country. The town centre is well preserved and is protected by law as an urban monument zone.

Administrative parts
Villages of Bojanovice and Čepice are administrative parts of Rabí.

Geography
It lies in the Bohemian Forest Foothills. The town is situated on the left bank of the Otava River.

History
The Rabí Castle was founded probably between 1124 and 1173. The first written mention of Rabí is from 1373, when the so-called Upper and Lower towns were mentioned. The first mention of the owners of Rabí is from 1380, when it was the property of Půta Švihovský of Rýzmberk. In 1420, the castle surrendered to the large army of Jan Žižka, then the castle was looted and burned. The castle was then repaired, but in 1421 it was again conquered by the Hussites and Jan Žižka lost his second eye here.

Sights
Rabí is known for the Rabí Castle, one of the biggest castles in the country. Today it is owned by the state and open to the public.

The Church of the Holy Trinity is part of the castle complex. It is a late Gothic building that was finished in 1498 as a castle chapel, later it became a parish church.

References

External links

Cities and towns in the Czech Republic
Populated places in Klatovy District
Prácheňsko